Gracie Junita (born 11 June 1990) is a Malaysian diver. She competed in the women's 3 metre springboard event at the 2004 Summer Olympics.

References

External links
 

1990 births
Living people
Malaysian female divers
Olympic divers of Malaysia
Divers at the 2004 Summer Olympics
Place of birth missing (living people)
21st-century Malaysian women